Manuel Carballo (born 10 March 1948) is a Spanish sprinter. He competed in the men's 4 × 100 metres relay at the 1972 Summer Olympics.

References

External links
 

1948 births
Living people
Athletes (track and field) at the 1972 Summer Olympics
Spanish male sprinters
Olympic athletes of Spain
Place of birth missing (living people)
20th-century Spanish people
21st-century Spanish people